is a former Japanese football player.

He previously played for Roasso Kumamoto and Shonan Bellmare.

References

External links

1986 births
Living people
People from Yachimata
Ryutsu Keizai University alumni
Association football people from Chiba Prefecture
Japanese footballers
J1 League players
J2 League players
J3 League players
Japan Football League players
Nagoya Grampus players
Roasso Kumamoto players
Shonan Bellmare players
Blaublitz Akita players
Vonds Ichihara players
Association football midfielders